Muslehuddin Ahmad (died on 10 September 2012) was a Bangladeshi diplomat and university administrator. He was the founder of North South University, the first private university in Bangladesh and served as its first vice-chancellor. He was the ambassador of Bangladesh to France and Romania.

Career
Ahmad joined the government service in 1956 through Central Superior Services.

During the Bangladesh Liberation War in 1971, he defected from the then Pakistan embassy in France. He later returned to Dhaka and took over Bangladesh Biman to lead the airline as its first and only chairman. During 1985–86, he served as the ambassador of Bangladesh to Romania. He founded North South University in 1992 and served as the first vice-chancellor of the university. Later in 2004, he served as the vice-chancellor of Presidency University, Bangladesh.

He authored a book, "Promised Land", on the Israeli–Palestinian conflict.

Personal life
Ahmad was married to Shaista Ahmad who was a professor of Zoology at Dhaka College and Titumir College and a founder general member at North South University.

Ahmad suffered a stroke and had been in a coma since 1 July 2012. He died on September 10 at the Square Hospital in Dhaka.

Works
Books
 The Tale of the first private university of Bangladesh North South University (2004)
 Promised Land (2010)

Newspaper articles

References

2012 deaths
Bangladeshi diplomats
Ambassadors of Bangladesh to Romania
Vice-Chancellors of North South University
Academic staff of the North South University
1930s births